Pinnington is an English surname. Notable people with this surname include:

 Edward Pinnington (1846–1921), Scottish art historian
 Geoffrey Pinnington (1919–1995), British newspaper editor
 Todd Pinnington (born 1973), Australian cricketer

English-language surnames